Floyd Levine (born February 23, 1932) is an American film and television actor. He played Dr. Ralph Harris in the 1978 film Bloodbrothers. He also played Gen. Duncan in the 1988 film Braddock: Missing in Action III and Lt. Mellin in the 1988 film Angel III: The Final Chapter.

Levine guest-starred in numerous television programs including Quincy, M.E., Hill Street Blues, Hart to Hart, Charlie's Angels, The Love Boat, Police Squad!, Three's Company, The A-Team, The Dukes of Hazzard, Head of the Class, Columbo and Archie Bunker's Place. He also appeared in a few episodes of Cagney & Lacey, Manimal, Crazy Like a Fox, Cousin Skeeter and Arliss.

Filmography

Film

Television

References

External links 

Rotten Tomatoes profile

1932 births
Living people
Male actors from New York (state)
American male television actors
American male film actors
20th-century American male actors
21st-century American male actors